Grazzini is an Italian surname. It may refer to:

 Anton Francesco Grazzini (1810–1879), Italian and Russian general
 Antonio Francesco Grazzini (1503–1584), Italian author
 Benedetto Grazzini (1474–c.1552), Italian architect and sculptor 
 Marco Grazzini, Canadian actor
 Sebastián Grazzini (born 1981), Argentine footballer

Italian-language surnames